The 6th Engineer Support Battalion (6th ESB or 6th EngSptBn), is an engineering battalion of the United States Marine Corps Reserve. They are headquartered in Portland, Oregon, and they fall under the command of the 4th Marine Logistics Group.

Current units
 Headquarters and Service Company – Portland, Oregon
 Bridge Company A – Battle Creek, Michigan
 Bridge Company B – Folsom, Pennsylvania
 Bridge Company C – Memphis, Tennessee
 Bulk Fuel Company A – Tucson, Arizona
 Det 1 – Fort Lewis, Washington
 Det 2 – Bakersfield, California
 Bulk Fuel Company B – Wilmington, Delaware
Det 1 – Green Bay, Wisconsin
 Bulk Fuel Company C – Luke Air Force Base, Arizona
 Engineer Support Company – Battle Creek, Michigan
 Engineer Company C – Peoria, Illinois

History

World War II
The Battalion was activated on 1 November 1944 at Guadalcanal as the 6th Engineer Battalion, 6th Marine Division. During World War II, they participated in the Battle of Okinawa and the Occupation of Japan (August–November 1945). In October 1945, they were redeployed to Tsingtao, China. The battalion was deactivated 26 March 1946.

1957–1975
The Battalion was reactivated on 1 November 1957 at Swan Island, Portland, Oregon as the 3rd Engineer Battalion of the Marine Corps Reserve. On 1 July 1962, they were redesignated as the 5th Engineer Battalion.

1976–1997
Redesignated again on 31 May 1976 as the 6th Engineer Support Battalion (6th ESB), 4th Force Service Support Group. Elements of the battalion participated in Operation Desert Shield and Operation Desert Storm in Southwest Asia from January til April 1991.

Operation Iraqi Freedom

2003
In Operation Iraqi Freedom, 6th ESB was responsible for fueling coalition forces as they moved northward through Iraq, and were entrenched in combat during the Battle of Nasiriyah. They also provided purified water supplies to the Marine Corps desert and urban encampments during Operation Iraqi Freedom. During Iraq's worst sandstorm in 20 years, Reserve Marines of the 6th ESB, along with active duty Marines of 7th ESB and 8th ESB Bulk Fuel Companies, constructed the longest fuel line in the history of the Marine Corps.

Marines of the 6th ESB were awarded the Navy Presidential Unit Citation for "extraordinary heroism in action against an armed enemy" during Operation Iraqi Freedom.

2004–2005
Continued support in 2004 to 2005 was given by Engineer Support Company from Portland, Oregon (reinforced by Detachment 1 Bulk Fuel Company A from Fort Lewis, Washington), and Bridge Company A from Battle Creek, Michigan. During this time Engineer Support Company was re-designated as Combat Service Support Company 113 (CSSC-113). Missions during this time included base operations in over a dozen different locations and resupply convoys during Operation Phantom Fury in November 2004. Four Marines were killed in action during this tour. Bridge Company A was attached to the US Army's 155th Engineer Group and rebuilt and maintained bridges all over South/Central Iraq. Their most significant repair mission was to repair a highway bridge at Checkpoint 34A (South of Camp Striker) on Main Supply Route Tampa during early November 2004 that had been damaged by VBIED attacks in order stop the flow of supplies and reinforcements to Fallujah during the campaign there. Projected to take 7 days to repair, Bridge Company A repaired the bridge while under fire in less than 32 hours.

Operation Enduring Freedom

2011–2012
From July 2011 to Feb. 2012 (OEF 11–2), over 100 Marines from the 6th ESB and individual augments of 6th Communications Battalion deployed as Engineer Company attached to Combat Logistics Battalion 6 to Helmand Province, Afghanistan, during Operation Enduring Freedom.

The majority of the company was based out of Camp Leatherneck, with small detachments of Bulk Fuels and Utilities Marines supporting more than a dozen sites throughout the Area of Operations.  Combined teams from the engineer, motor transport, and heavy equipment platoons conducted extensive construction projects and road repairs for infantry and special operations units throughout the northern half of Helmand Province.

2012–2013
From 2012 to February 2013, 200 Marines from various units in the battalion, supported by individual augments from 6th Communications Battalion, deployed under the title of Engineer Company Bravo.  The company integrated into Combat Logistics Battalion 2, serving in a similar role as the OEF 11-2 deployment.

See also

List of United States Marine Corps battalions
Organization of the United States Marine Corps

References
Notes

Web

Official website
Current Battalion profile

4th Marine Logistics Group
ESB6